Clopton is an unincorporated community and census-designated place (CDP) in Dale County, Alabama, United States.

History 
Clopton had a post office from August 22, 1853, to November 19, 2011; it still has its own ZIP code, 36317.

During the Spanish flu epidemic, in 1919 a local physician reported that he had treated more than four-hundred cases in the community.

Demographics

Clopton was listed as an unincorporated community in the 1880 U.S. Census with a population of 142.

Notable people
 Henry B. Steagall, U.S. Representative from 1915 to 1943. Co-sponsored the Glass-Steagall Act and Wagner-Steagall National Housing Act.
 Hannah McKay, a fictional character portrayed by Yvonne Strahovski who is romantically involved with Dexter Morgan on Dexter.

References

Unincorporated communities in Dale County, Alabama
Unincorporated communities in Alabama
Census-designated places in Dale County, Alabama
Census-designated places in Alabama